Gosford is an unincorporated community in Rayburn Township, Armstrong County, Pennsylvania, United States.

History
Gosford had a post office that operated from 1879 to 1905.

References

Unincorporated communities in Armstrong County, Pennsylvania
Unincorporated communities in Pennsylvania